Benedetto Rezzani (died July 1639) was a Roman Catholic prelate who served as Bishop of Sagone (1635–1639).

Biography
On 17 Sep 1635, Benedetto Rezzani appointed during the papacy of Pope Urban VIII as Bishop of Sagone. On 23 Sep 1635, he was consecrated bishop by Giulio Cesare Sacchetti, Cardinal-Priest of Santa Susanna. He served as Bishop of Sagone until his death in July 1639
.

References

External links and additional sources
 (for Chronology of Bishops) 
 (for Chronology of Bishops)  

17th-century Roman Catholic bishops in Genoa
Bishops appointed by Pope Urban VIII
1635 deaths